When Louis Met... is a series of documentary films by Louis Theroux. The series was originally broadcast on BBC Two from 2000 to 2002. In the series, Theroux accompanied a different British celebrity in each programme as they went about their day-to-day business, interviewing them about their lives and experiences as he did so. His episode about Jimmy Savile (When Louis Met Jimmy) was voted one of the top 50 documentaries of all time in a survey by Channel Four. In another episode (When Louis Met the Hamiltons), the Conservative MP Neil Hamilton and his wife Christine, were arrested during the course of filming following allegations of indecent assault; these were subsequently found to be false. The show did not return for a third series, and Theroux said that he had difficulty in finding people to appear.

Episodes

Series overview

Series 1 (2000–01)

Series 2 (2002)

Awards
Winner - 2002 BAFTA TV Award - Richard Dimbleby Award for the Best Presenter (Factual, Features and News) - For the "When Louis Met..." series of films.

Nominated - 2002 Flaherty Documentary Award - For "When Louis Met...The Hamiltons"

"When Louis Met... Jimmy" was voted number 50 in Channel 4's 2005 poll of the 50 greatest documentaries.

Home releases
When Louis Met... has been released on PAL DVD in a number of best-of sets. Originally, Vol.1/Vol.2 and Vol.3/Vol.4 were released as two disc sets, before being split. Later the 4 volumes were released as a limited edition box set.

 The Best of Louis Theroux's Weird Weekends
 Louis Theroux's Weird Weekends: Porn
 Louis Theroux's Weird Weekends: Survivalists
 Louis Theroux's Weird Weekends: Gangsta Rap
 Louis Theroux's Weird Weekends: UFOs
 DVD Bonus: When Louis Met...Jimmy
 DVD Bonus: In-Vision Commentary by Louis & Sir Jimmy Savile OBE
 The Best of Louis Theroux's Weird Weekends Volume II
 Louis Theroux's Weird Weekends: Swingers
 Louis Theroux's Weird Weekends: South Africa
 Louis Theroux's Weird Weekends: Wrestling
 Louis Theroux's Weird Weekends: Hypnosis
 DVD Bonus: When Louis Met...The Hamiltons
 DVD Bonus: In-Vision Commentary by Louis and the Hamiltons
 The Best of Louis Theroux's Weird Weekends Volume I
 Louis Theroux's Weird Weekends: Porn
 Louis Theroux's Weird Weekends: Survivalists
 DVD Bonus: In-Vision Commentary by Louis and Jimmy Taped in Jimmy's Penthouse
 The Best of Louis Theroux's Weird Weekends Volume II
 Louis Theroux's Weird Weekends: Wrestling
 Louis Theroux's Weird Weekends: Hypnosis
 DVD Bonus: When Louis Met...The Hamiltons
 DVD Bonus: In-Vision Commentary by Louis and the Hamiltons
 The Best of Louis Theroux's Weird Weekends Volume III
 Louis Theroux's Weird Weekends: Swingers
 Louis Theroux's Weird Weekends: South Africa
 DVD Bonus: In-Vision Commentary by Louis and the Hamiltons
 The Best of Louis Theroux's Weird Weekends Volume IV
 Louis Theroux's Weird Weekends: Gangsta Rap
 Louis Theroux's Weird Weekends: UFOs
 DVD Bonus: When Louis Met...Jimmy
 DVD Bonus: In-Vision Commentary by Louis and Jimmy Taped in Jimmy's Penthouse
 The Best of Louis Theroux's Weird Weekends Volume I, II, III & IV
 Louis Theroux's Weird Weekends: Porn
 Louis Theroux's Weird Weekends: Survivalists
 DVD Bonus: In-Vision Commentary by Louis and Jimmy Taped in Jimmy's Penthouse
 Louis Theroux's Weird Weekends: Wrestling
 Louis Theroux's Weird Weekends: Hypnosis
 DVD Bonus: When Louis Met...The Hamiltons
 DVD Bonus: In-Vision Commentary by Louis and the Hamiltons
 Louis Theroux's Weird Weekends: Swingers
 Louis Theroux's Weird Weekends: South Africa
 DVD Bonus: In-Vision Commentary by Louis and the Hamiltons
 Louis Theroux's Weird Weekends: Gangsta Rap
 Louis Theroux's Weird Weekends: UFOs
 DVD Bonus: When Louis Met...Jimmy
 DVD Bonus: In-Vision Commentary by Louis and Jimmy Taped in Jimmy's Penthouse
 Louis Theroux: The Collection
 Louis Theroux's Weird Weekends: Porn
 Louis Theroux's Weird Weekends: Head for the Hills aka Survivalists
 Louis Theroux's Weird Weekends: Swingers
 Louis Theroux's Weird Weekends: Black Nationalism
 Louis Theroux's Weird Weekends: Wrestling
 Louis Theroux's Weird Weekends: South Africa
 Louis Theroux's Weird Weekends: Thai Brides
 Louis Theroux's Weird Weekends: Gangsta Rap
 When Louis Met...Jimmy
 When Louis Met...Paul and Debbie
 When Louis Met...The Hamiltons
 When Louis Met...Ann Widdecombe
 When Louis Met...Chris Eubank
 Louis and the Brothel
 Louis and the Nazis
 TV Nation: New Klan
 TV Nation: Millennium
 TV Nation: Jerusalem Syndrome
 TV Nation: Cops for Christ

See also
 List of Louis Theroux documentaries
 Louis Theroux's BBC Two specials
 Louis Theroux's Weird Weekends

References

External links

Louis Theroux's BBC Two specials
BBC television documentaries
Biographical documentary films
English-language films
2000 British television series debuts
2002 British television series endings
Jimmy Savile